Michele Fanoli (1807 – 19 September 1876) was an Italian painter and engraver, mainly of religious subjects and portraits in a Neoclassical style.

Biography
He was born in Cittadella, province of Padua. He studied under Leopoldo Cicognara at the Academy of Fine Arts at Modena, and at the Accademia di Belle Arti of Venice at the urging of Cicognara. He traveled to Paris where he learned the art of lithography.

In Paris he made lithographic reproductions of major works including Deposition (1848), Les Willis (1848), Marriage at Cana (1849), Orpheus (1854), Last Supper (1855), and Immaculate Conception (1855), printed by Lemercier in Paris. When he returned to Italy in 1860, he was made director of the School of Lithography at the Brera Academy.

Fanoli made a widely circulated painting from a scene in the opera I Promessi Sposi. He also engraved a fanciful inventory of the sculptural works of Antonio Canova (1840). He was a lifelong friend of Luigi Carrer. He painted two works in Cittadella: La riconoscenza displayed in City Hall, and an altarpiece (Blessed Veronica Giuliani receives Stigmata surrounded by Saints) for the principal church of the town.

References

1807 births
1876 deaths
Artists from Padua
19th-century Italian painters
19th-century Italian male artists
Italian male painters
Italian engravers
Accademia di Belle Arti di Venezia alumni
Academic staff of Brera Academy